Unión Deportiva Lanzarote is a Spanish football team based in Arrecife, Lanzarote, in the autonomous community of Canary Islands. Founded in 1970 it plays in Tercera División RFEF – Group 12, holding home games at the Ciudad Deportiva de Lanzarote (sports city), a 6,000-seat stadium which is shared with CD Orientación Marítima.

History
Unión Deportiva Lanzarote was formed in August 1970, in views to a representation outside of the island. In its beginnings the team played on picón (volcanic granules), eventually moving on to FIFA-approved artificial grass.

In its first competitive season, 1970–71, the team won the Segunda Regional Insular championship (second regional division), and for many years battled through local and Canarian leagues until making its debuts in Tercera División, in 1980; the first campaign ended with a fifth place, and it was also here the club had its first taste of the Copa del Rey – after a 0–0 home draw with neighbours UD Las Palmas, Lanzarote was ripped apart 0–5 in the second leg.

The 1998–99 season saw Lanzarote end the campaign in third position, with promotion to Segunda División B for the first time ever. It was a whistle-stop visit to the category, as the Island of Volcanoes club was relegated in the first year.

From the 2001–02 campaign onwards, the team consolidated its position in the third level. In a cup match against also-islanders CD Tenerife, local legend Maciot bagged a hat-trick in a 5–1 shock win, in front of a 5,000 home crowd. The reward for this feat was a dream clash with La Liga powerhouse Real Madrid, led by Vicente del Bosque and with the likes of Raúl González, Steve McManaman, Roberto Carlos, Luís Figo and Zinedine Zidane on board: after the favorite's early lead, part-time waiter Oscar Vladamir equalized and secured his place in local football history, but the club eventually lost it 1–3.

Lanzarote continued establishing itself and, in 2002–03, finished the campaign in third place and, for the first time, competed in the play-off to reach Segunda División. President was Estanislao García, as manager José Luis Mendilibar – later of Athletic Bilbao and Real Valladolid – led the team in the cup tie against Atlético Madrid, which was only sealed for the Colchoneros (1–2) with a late José María Movilla strike.

2003–04 was Lanzarote's finest season in division three, ending the campaign as champions, but once again failing to clinch promotion in the play-offs. That season also reserved a good domestic cup performance, against rising Sevilla FC: opponent manager Joaquín Caparrós refused to play on Lanzarote's artificial grass, and the game was held in Gran Canaria where over 5,000 supporters watched the Conejeros perform valiantly, only to be downed with a goal by Júlio Baptista after a cross from José Antonio Reyes.

In 2004–05's Spanish Cup, Lanzarote defeated Héctor Cúper's RCD Mallorca's 2–1, followed by another downing of a top level team, Athletic Bilbao also 2–1. However, the latter stage was already contested in two legs, and the smaller side were crushed 0–6 at San Mamés, falling just one game short of the competition's quarterfinals. From 2004 to 2009, in the league, the team consecutively clinched mid-table positions. In the 2018–19 season the club finished 5th in the Tercera División, Group 12, just 7 points away from the 1st place.

Season to season

10 seasons in Segunda División B
23 seasons in Tercera División
1 season in Tercera División RFEF
15 seasons in Categorías Regionales

Current squad

Famous players
Note: this list includes players that have played at least 100 league games and/or have reached international status.
 Raúl Fabiani
 Jotha
 Fredrik Söderström

References

External links
Official website 
Futbolme team profile 

Football clubs in the Canary Islands
Sport in Lanzarote
Association football clubs established in 1970
1970 establishments in Spain
Arrecife